Norma is a group of companies based in the Indian city of Ahmedabad, that manufactures products ranging from detergents, soaps, cement, cosmetics, salt, soda ash, LAB and injectables. Karsanbhai Patel, an entrepreneur and philanthropist, started Nirma in 1969 as a one-man operation.

History
In 1969, Dr. Karsanbhai Patel, a chemist at the Gujarat Government's Department of Mining and Geology manufactured phosphate-free synthetic detergent powder, and started selling it locally. The new yellow powder was priced at ₹3.50 per kg, at a time when HUL's Surf was priced at ₹13. Nirma sold well in Ruppur (Gujarat), Patel's hometown. He started packing the formulation in a 10x10 ft room in his house. Patel named the powder Nirma, after his daughter Nirupama. He was able to sell about 15-20 packets a day on his way to the office on bicycle, some 15 km away. By 1985, Nirma washing powder had become one of the most popular household detergents in many parts of the country.

By 1999, Nirma was a major consumer brand, offering a range of detergents, soaps and personal care products. The group also set up a healthcare subsidiary called Nirlife to manufacture intravenous fluids.

In November 2007, Nirma purchased American raw materials company Searles Valley Minerals Inc., making it among the top seven soda ash manufacturers in the world.

Nirma Group started cement manufacturing in 2014 from a single plant in Nimbol. In 2016, Nirma acquired Lafarge India's cement assets for $1.4 billion.

Major products

 Soda ash
 Linear alkyl benzene
 Soaps
 Detergents
 Edible & industrial salt
 Alpha-olefin sulfonate
 Sulfuric acid
 Glycerin
 Infusions
 Injectables
 Critical care products
 Medical disposables
 Sugar
 Cement
 Single super phosphate
 Castor oil
 Multilayer tubes 		
 Seamless tubes 		
 Tube laminate 	
 Flexible laminate 		
 Paper & plastic cups 		
 Tarpaulin 		
 Injection molding
 Bromine
 Phosphoric acid

See also
 Nirma University of Science & Technology

References

External links
 Official Nirma company website

Chemical companies of India
Manufacturing companies based in Ahmedabad
Laundry detergents
Chemical companies established in 1969
Manufacturing companies established in 1969
Indian companies established in 1969
Companies formerly listed on the Bombay Stock Exchange
Indian brands
1969 establishments in Gujarat